Uzytamak (Uźıtamaq) is a rural locality (a selo) and the administrative centre of Alkinsky Selsoviet, Chishminsky District, Bashkortostan, Russia. The population was 222 as of 2010. There are 4 streets.

Geography 
Uzytamak is located 22 km northeast of Chishmy (the district's administrative centre) by road. Alkino is the nearest rural locality.

References 

Rural localities in Chishminsky District